The white-crowned starling (Lamprotornis albicapillus) is a species of starling in the family Sturnidae. It is found in Djibouti, Ethiopia, Kenya, and Somalia.

References

white-crowned starling
Birds of the Horn of Africa
white-crowned starling
white-crowned starling
Taxonomy articles created by Polbot